This is a town and municipality located in the province of Málaga in the autonomous community of Andalusia in southern Spain. It is situated in the northeast of the province, in Guadalteba comarca. As of 2018, its population is 3,818. The town is the site of the Battle of Teba, which took place in 1330 during the Reconquista. Scottish knight   and feudal lord Sir James Douglas was killed at Teba during the same campaign.

References

External links 

 Teba in Andalucia.com
 Teba Municipal Website (in Spanish)
 Statistical information on Teba (in Spanish)
  Michelin Map of Teba
 Teba in hisnatiba.com

Municipalities in the Province of Málaga